Charles H. Johnson served as a member of the 1861–1862 California State Assembly, representing the 2nd District.

References

Year of birth missing
Year of death missing
Members of the California State Assembly
19th-century American politicians